The 2016–17 North Florida Ospreys men's basketball team represented the University of North Florida during the 2016–17 NCAA Division I men's basketball season. They were led by eighth–year head coach Matthew Driscoll and played their home games at UNF Arena on the university's campus in Jacksonville, Florida as members of the Atlantic Sun Conference (ASUN). They finished the season 15–19, 8–6 in ASUN play to finish in third place. As the No. 3 seed in the ASUN tournament, they defeated Jacksonville and Lipscomb before losing to Florida Gulf Coast in the championship game.

Previous season
The Ospreys finished the 2015–16 season 22–12, 10–4 in ASUN play to win the regular season championship. In the ASUB tournament they defeated USC Upstate before losing to Florida Gulf Coast in the semifinals. As a regular season conference champion who failed to win their conference tournament, the Ospreys received an automatic bid to the National Invitation Tournament where they lost to Florida in the first round.

Roster

Schedule and results

|-
!colspan=9 style=| Non-conference regular season

|-
!colspan=9 style=| Atlantic Sun Conference regular season

|-
!colspan=9 style=| Atlantic Sun tournament

References

North Florida Ospreys men's basketball seasons
North Florida
North Florida Ospreys men's basketball
North Florida Ospreys men's basketball